The Trespass (Scotland) Act 1865 (28 & 39 Vict c 56) is an Act of Parliament in the United Kingdom. 

The Act creates a criminal offence of trespass in Scotland in certain circumstances and applies a penalty which has been amended by the Criminal Justice Act 1982 to that of a fine not exceeding Level 1 on the standard scale for violation.
As of 2011, this was £200.

The Act applies to a wide variety of private property, although only to lodging, squatting and encampment on such property.  Between 2005 and 2010, there were 26 convictions.

Developments
Subsequent legislation, such as the Land Reform (Scotland) Act 2003, has created more general rights of access and encampment on private land in certain circumstances, with specific exclusions.

Footnotes

References
 The Trespass (Scotland) Act 1865 on the UK Statute Law Database

Acts of the Parliament of the United Kingdom concerning Scotland
Scots property law
United Kingdom Acts of Parliament 1865
19th century in Scotland
1865 in Scotland
Squatting in Scotland